Jen Banbury is an American playwright, author and journalist. She studied at Yale University and was a member of Manuscript Society. After publishing plays and a novel, she turned to reporting in 2003, becoming a freelancer who has reported for NPR, Salon.com, and other organizations.  In 2003 and 2004, she reported from Baghdad for Salon. On March 3, 2004, Salon published her story "Guantanamo on Steroids", one of the earliest articles about U.S. soldiers' abuse of Iraqi prisoners at Abu Ghraib. It was listed as one of the "Best of Salon" for 2003. Her Salon reporting was cited and her story "Night Raid in Baghdad" was reprinted in Boots on the Ground: Stories of American Soldiers from Iraq to Afghanistan by Clint Willis.

Publications
Novel: Like a Hole in the Head, 1998. Mentioned on pages 14, 18, 138, and 139 of Novelist's Essential Guide to Crafting Scenes by Raymond Obstfeld.
Play: How Alex Looks When She's Hurt, 1998

References

External links
August 2004 Interview with Banbury
"Guantanamo on Steroids" from Salon.
"For the first time, I've started to feel unsafe in Iraq" March 20, 2004 story on Salon.
"Fleeing Baghdad" April 7, 2004 story on Salon.
"Vigilantes Go on the Offensive to Bait Net Crooks" June 24, 2005 story for the NPR program Morning Edition.
A Mobile Propane Salesman in Baghdad Soundclip broadcast on All Things Considered on September 15, 2006.
"Latest in the fight against arson" June 30, 2006 story for Minnesota Public Radio program Marketplace.
Review of Like a Hole in the Head by Suzette Lalime Davidson on Salon (May 1, 1998.
Review of Hole and comments on Banbury's other work by Sarah Weinman, the Baltimore Sun's crime fiction columnist.
Review of Hole by Brian Morton in The New York Times, Published: May 3, 1998.

Year of birth missing (living people)
Living people
Yale University alumni
NPR personalities
American women journalists
American women dramatists and playwrights
21st-century American women